Chelsea Brown (born Lois Brown, December 6, 1942 – March 27, 2017) was an American-born actress of television and film, comedian and dancer, who appeared as a regular performer in comedy series Rowan & Martin's Laugh-In.  She had a successful career in her native land before emigrating to Australia, where she became well-known mostly for her roles in soap opera/serials including top-rating Number 96 and as Abby Rossiter Patchett on E Street.

Early career in the United States
Brown was born as Lois Brown in Chicago, Illinois to Mildred and Edward Brown. She appeared in a segment of a first-season episode of Love, American Style titled "Love and the Militant", with fellow Laugh-In alumnus Stu Gilliam.  Other guest roles included appearances in Marcus Welby, M.D., Ironside, Matt Lincoln, The Flying Nun, Match Game (in 1974) and, in the UK, The Two Ronnies, singing The Carpenters song "Let Me Be the One". She also appeared in the films Sweet Charity (1969), Dial Hot Line (1970) and The Thing with Two Heads (1972).

Emigration and career in Australia
Brown met and became engaged to Australian property developer Kelvin Barry Hirst whilst holidaying in Acapulco, Mexico in 1973. Brown emigrated to Australia shortly after that, Hirst became her manager and they were married in 1977. They divorced in the early 1980s. Hirst features as the male vocal on Brown's record Day Dreaming (October 1975). In 1982 Brown released a second album self-titled Chelsea.

Brown became a familiar figure on Australian television, with appearances on Graham Kennedy's Blankety Blanks, Jimmy Hannan's Celebrity Squares plus ongoing roles in soap operas Number 96 (in 1977), The Power, The Passion (1989), in a regular role as the resident restaurant singer and Network Ten's E Street (in 1990–1991) as a nightclub singer who falls for the charms of local publican Ernie Patchett and various advertisements. She had a guest role in the Australian-filmed Tzv series revival of Mission: Impossible (1988). Film roles in Australia included The Return of Captain Invincible (1982) and Welcome to Woop Woop (1997).

In the mid-1990s, she was married to fellow E Street'' actor Vic Rooney, who died in 2002, after which she returned to the United States.

Filmography

FILM

TELEVISION

Death
Brown died in her hometown of Chicago, Illinois, March 27, 2017, at the age of 74, from pneumonia.

References

External links
 
 

1942 births
2017 deaths
American television personalities
American women television personalities
Actresses from Chicago
African-American actresses
American television actresses
American film actresses
American women comedians
Comedians from Illinois
Deaths from dementia in Illinois
American emigrants to Australia
20th-century African-American people
21st-century African-American people
20th-century African-American women
21st-century African-American women